Simylus, Simulus, or Simylos may refer to:

Simylus, Athenian comic poet of 4th century BC
Simylus, Athenian tragic actor of 4th century BC
Simylus of Neapolis, Olympic winner in stadion 248 BC
Simylus, poor farmer in the poem Moretum traditionally ascribed to Virgil

References
Dictionary of Greek and Roman Biography and Mythology Simylus